St Marylebone Grammar School (SMGS) was a grammar school located in the London borough of the City of Westminster, from 1792 to 1981.

History

Philological School
Founded as the Philological Society by Thomas Collingwood, under the patronage of the Prince Frederick, Duke of York and Albany, its object was to help "the heads of families, who by unexpected misfortune, have been reduced from a station of comfort and respectability." Founded in Mary Street (later renamed Stanhope Street, N.W. 1), it moved to Marylebone Road in 1827. Its fortunes improved largely due to Edwin Abbott, headmaster from 1827 to 1872. After Abbott, the school's financial position deteriorated.

Grammar school
In 1901 it was accepted in trust by the London County Council and renamed St Marylebone Grammar School. After World War II it recovered. Under headmaster Philip Wayne it developed artistic activities, acquired shared use of playing fields in Sudbury Hill, and established a country base in the village of Forest Green, near Leith Hill. In 1957 the motto "ex animo tamquam Deo" ("from the heart, as from God") was added to the school's crest at the suggestion of the deputy headmaster Kenneth Crook.

After Philip Wayne, SMGS was led by Harry Llewellyn-Smith as headmaster until 1970. During his period a new and separate science block was built a short walk away from the school's main site. Roy Mansell led the science team and was for a short period the last headmaster after Patrick Hutton.

Closure
Soon after headmaster Patrick Hutton (formerly head of English at St Paul's School) arrived in 1970, the Inner London Education Authority (ILEA) proposed to merge SMGS with the local secondary modern school, Rutherford School, later part of North Westminster School. ILEA itself came into conflict with the new Conservative government, whose secretary of state for education Margaret Thatcher took an interest in SMGS. By 1981, however, SMGS had closed.

Current use of buildings
The former science block continues in educational use as the Cosway Street Centre, part of City of Westminster College. The main school building consisted of the original school building on Marylebone Road and two later wings in Lisson Grove; the Lisson Grove buildings were demolished and replaced with an office block. The original building is Grade II listed and remains intact; it is now part of Abercorn School.

Notable old boys
Former pupils of the school are known as Old Philologians. 

 Adam Ant (Stuart Goddard), pop singer 
 John Barnes, footballer
 Steve Barron, film director 
 Peter Batkin, art expert
 Sir Michael Beetham, Marshal of the Royal Air Force 
 Barry Blue (Barry Green), pop singer and writer
 Anastasios Christodoulou, secretary general of the Association of Commonwealth Universities from 1980 to 1996
 Len Deighton, author
 William Floyd, head of the Department of Ergonomics and Cybernetics at Loughborough University from 1960 to 1975.
 Benny Green, musician
 Sir Leicester Harmsworth, 1st Baronet, Liberal MP for Caithness from 1900 to 1918 and Caithness and Sutherland from 1918 to 1922
 Robin Harper, Member of the Scottish Parliament for the Lothians (1999 - 2011). First member of the Green Party to be elected to a parliament in the UK.
 Michael Henley, Bishop of St Andrews, Dunkeld and Dunblane from 1995 to 2004
 Sir Charles Solomon Henry, 1st Baronet, Liberal MP for Wellington (Shropshire) from 1906 to 1918 and the Wrekin from 1918–9
 Eric Hobsbawm, historian and author
 Anthony A. Hyman, molecular cell biologist and director of the Max Planck Institute for Molecular Cell Biology and Genetics
 Jerome K. Jerome, Edwardian author
Martyn Lloyd-Jones, Welsh preacher
 Sir Vincent Lloyd-Jones, judge
 Francis Paget, Bishop of Oxford from 1901 to 1911
 Sir Michael Pepper, Pender Professor of Nanoelectronics at UCL since 2009
 John Price (England cricketer)
 Neil Rhind, writer and historian
 Sir Landon Ronald, conductor
 Irving Scholar, chairman, Tottenham Hotspur Football Club (1980s)
 E. H. Sothern, Shakespearean American Actor 
 John Staddon, professor, psychobiologist, Duke University 
 Sir Cyril Taylor, social entrepreneur
 Julien Temple, film director
 Sir Brian Vickers, professor of English literature from 1975 to 2003 at ETH Zurich
 Glenn White, professor of astronomy at The Open University
 Stuart Woolf, historian at the University of Essex

References

External links
 Old Philologians Association

1792 establishments in England
Educational institutions established in 1792
Defunct grammar schools in England

Defunct schools in the City of Westminster
Educational institutions disestablished in 1981
1981 disestablishments in England
Buildings and structures in Marylebone
Grade II listed buildings in the City of Westminster